"Don't Go" is a song by Australian pop group Pseudo Echo. The song was released in October 1985 as the lead single from their second studio album, Love an Adventure (1985). The song became the band's second top five single, reaching number 4 on the Australian Kent Music Report.

Track listing 
7" (EMI-1585)
Side A "Don't Go" – 3:53
Side B "Living in a Dream" (Jazz Version) – 3:20

12" (EMI – ED 136)
Side A "Don't Go" (extended) – 6:40
Side B "Don't Go" – 3:53
Side B "Living in a Dream" (Jazz Version) – 3:20

Charts

Weekly charts

Year-end charts

References 

1985 songs
1985 singles
Pseudo Echo songs